The Women's 63  kg weightlifting event was the third lightest women's event at the competition, limiting competitors to a maximum of 63 kilogrammes of body mass. The competition took place on 27 July at 16:00. The event took place at the Clyde Auditorium.

Result

* Winner determined on account of having less body weight

References

Weightlifting at the 2014 Commonwealth Games
Common